The Tonight Show with Jay Leno was an American late-night talk show hosted by Jay Leno that first aired from May 25, 1992 to May 29, 2009, and resumed its second production on March 1, 2010 until its ending on February 6, 2014 after Conan O'Brien's short tenure. This was the fourth incarnation of the Tonight Show series that began three days after Johnny Carson's tenure came to an end. This is a list of episodes for The Tonight Show with Jay Leno that aired from January 1, 1996 to December 31, 1999.

1996

January

February

March

April

May

June

July

August

September

October

November

December

1997

January

February

March

April

May

June

July

August

September

October

November

December

1998

January

February

March

April

May

June

July

August

September

October

November

December

1999

January

February

March

April

May

June

July

August

September

October

November

December

References

Episodes
Tonight Show with Jay Leno
Tonight Show with Jay Leno